Gestumblindi is a character in Norse mythology who appears in Hervarar saga and in Saxo Grammaticus' Gesta Danorum as Gestiblindus. Later, he also appears in several Scandinavian folk tales as Gest Blinde.

Hervarar saga
According to Hervarar saga, Gestumblindi was a powerful man in Reidgotaland, i.e. a Goth, who had angered king Heidrek by refusing to pay him tribute.

King Heidrek had in his hird twelve men who were entrusted to take care of all the legal disputes in the kingdom. If anyone had any complaint, they had the right to approach these men and would have right to both life and limb on the condition that they asked the king a number of riddles that the king could not answer.

Heidrek sent a message to Gestumblindi that if he did not appear at the court at a certain date, he would be imprisoned.

In desperation, Gestumblindi sacrificed to Odin asking him for assistance. Shortly thereafter, a stranger appeared at Gestumblindi's homestead, and this stranger also called himself Gestumblindi. The two men were so similar that no one could tell them apart. They changed clothes and Gestumblindi went away to hide.

Everyone thought that the new man was the real Gestumblindi and then the stranger went to king Heidrek and between them was the most exquisite contest in wisdom. Gestumblindi told riddles, mostly about nature but also about Norse mythology, and Heidrek answered them all (these riddles are presented in detail and they are among the most interesting riddles in Norse mythology).

Finally, Odin/Gestumblindi told Heidrek the same riddle that he had once asked Vafthruthnir, i.e. "What did Odin whisper in Balder's ear before Balder was cremated?" Heidrek, realising that Gestumblindi was Odin, became very angry and wanted to strike Odin with his cursed sword Tyrfing. Odin turned into a hawk, but Heidrek's sword cut off a piece of the bird's tail, which is why the hawk has the tail he has.

Gesta Danorum
Saxo Grammaticus relates that Gestiblindus was a king of the Geats who gave himself and his kingdom up to Frodi, the king of Denmark on condition that Frodi would defend him against Alrik, the king of Sweden.

Tyrfing cycle
Legendary Norsemen
Kings of the Geats
Odin